aka Torasan Dreams Springtime is a 1979 Japanese comedy film directed by Yoji Yamada. It stars Kiyoshi Atsumi as Torajirō Kuruma (Tora-san), and Kyōko Kagawa as his love interest or "Madonna". Tora-san's Dream of Spring is the twenty-fourth entry in the popular, long-running Otoko wa Tsurai yo series.

Synopsis
Tora-san returns to his family's home in Shibamata, Tokyo, to find a large American peddler living in his room, leading to various conflicts. As Tora-san struggles through his love with the local Madonna (references?) the American admits to falling for Sakura. Ultimately the two men find they have more in common than they thought.

Cast
 Kiyoshi Atsumi as Torajirō
 Herbert Edelman as Michael Jordan
 Chieko Baisho as Sakura
 Kyōko Kagawa as Keiko Takai
 Hiroko Hayashi as Megumi Takai
 Masami Shimojō as Kuruma Tatsuzō
 Chieko Misaki as Tsune Kuruma (Torajiro's aunt)
 Gin Maeda as Hiroshi Suwa
 Hayato Nakamura as Mitsuo Suwa
 HIroshi Inuzuka as Carpenter
 Hisao Dazai as Boss (Umetarō Katsura)
 Taiji Tonoyama
 Chishū Ryū as Gozen-sama

Critical appraisal
Kiyoshi Atsumi was nominated for Best Actor at the Japan Academy Prize ceremony for his performances in Tora-san's Dream of Spring and the previous entry in the series, Tora-san, the Matchmaker (also 1979). Chieko Baisho was nominated for Best Supporting Actress for the same two films. Stuart Galbraith IV notes that the American influence on this film, in the writing and in the acting, and the amusing conflicts between US and Japanese culture portrayed in the film makes it a particularly good entry point in the series for non-Japanese audiences. The German-language site molodezhnaja gives Tora-san's Dream of Spring three and a half out of five stars.

Availability
Tora-san's Dream of Spring was released theatrically on December 28, 1979. In Japan, the film was released on videotape in 1996, and in DVD format in 2005 and 2008.

References

Bibliography

English

German

Japanese

External links
 Tora-san's Dream of Spring at www.tora-san.jp (official site)

1979 films
Films directed by Yoji Yamada
Films set in Kyoto
1979 comedy films
1970s Japanese-language films
Otoko wa Tsurai yo films
Shochiku films
Films with screenplays by Yôji Yamada
Japanese sequel films
1970s Japanese films